Næstved Boldklub is a Danish association football team based in Næstved in the South of Zealand. Næstved Boldklub is the professional superstructure of the parent club Næstved Idræts Forening (Næstved IF) and currently plays in the Danish 2nd Division, the third tier of Danish football league system.

The team's regular colours have been green and white throughout the club's history. It plays its home games at TintShop Park. The main rivals are Nykøbing FC (former B1901) and Slagelse B&I. Other rivals are Herfølge Boldklub and Køge Boldklub (the two clubs now merged to HB Køge).

Formerly a regular team in the top half of the Danish Superliga, Næstved has been tempting fate in the second and third tier since after the relegation. Since then Næstved Boldklub have been struggling financially which have been a factor in the club's struggles limiting and sometimes banning the club from signing contracts with players.

History
Næstved Idræts Forening (Næstved IF) was formed in 1939 as a union of Næstved Idræts Klub and Næstved Boldklub the latter which had already played a season in the Mesterskabs-serien (then the best league in Denmark). During the Second World War the Danish football leagues were replaced by geographical divisions. With the beginning of the 1945–1946 season the football pyramid was reestablished with Næstved being placed in the 3rd Division.
In 1970 Næstved won promotion to the 2nd Division finishing third the following season to secure promotion to the 1st Division (the then top division in Denmark). Again Næstved finished third in their first season after promotion winning bronze medal in 1972.

After the club's three mostly successful decades from the 1970s until the 1990s, including two time runner-up in the league (1980 in front of an all time capacity record of 20,315 spectators at Næstved Stadion and again in 1988), the club was relegated following the 1995–1996 season after finishing last.

In 1996 Næstved Boldklub became the professional superstructure of the parent club Næstved Idræts Forening (Næstved IF).

In 2000 Næstved was relegated to the 2nd Division (third tier in Danish football league structure) for the first time since 1963. Enduring financial trouble the club was then several times just about to be relegated to Danmarks Serien (non-league), and if that would have happened, it would be the first time ever for Næstved not to be in one of the three best divisions of Denmark.

The team were promoted to the 1st division and participated in NordicBetLiga season 2018/2019.
During the season Næstved was in the battle for a promotional spot, but in the last round of the season it was decided that Lyngby took 3rd place in front of Næstved, who finished 4th.

During the Summer of 2019 and as preparation for the 2019/20 season, Næstved sacked manager Michael Hemmingsen.

Honours
 Danish Championship
 Runner-up (2): 1980, 1988
Danish Cup
Runner-up (1): 1994

Other results:
 2003 – Danish indoor soccer champions
 1994 – Danish Cup runner-up (losing the cup-final against Brøndby IF after penalties)
 1988 – Silver medal winners
 1987 – European Futsal indoor soccer champions
 1986 – Bronze medal winners
 1981 – Bronze medal winners
 1980 – Silver medal winners
 1975 – Bronze medal winners
 1972 – Bronze medal winners

Achievements
24 seasons in the Highest Danish League
33 seasons in the Second Highest Danish League
13 seasons in the Third Highest Danish League

Players

Current squad
As of 31 January 2023

Out on loan

Shirt number 7
On 12 June 2006, Næstved midfielder Rasmus Green suddenly collapsed during training and was – in spite of subsequent reviving-attempts from fellow players, the physio and a present doctor – dead on arrival at Næstved Hospital. The number seven is retired in his memory.

Recent History
{|class="wikitable"
|- style="background:#efefef;"
! Season
!
! Pos.
! Pl.
! W
! D
! L
! GS
! GA
! P
!Cup
!Notes
|-
|2005–06
|2D
|  style="text-align:right; background:green;"|1
|align=right|26||align=right|17||align=right|6||align=right|3
|align=right|64||align=right|22||align=right|57
||Fourth round
|Promoted
|-
|2006–07
|1D
|  style="text-align:right; background:;"|8
|align=right|30||align=right|12||align=right|7||align=right|11
|align=right|54||align=right|35||align=right|43
||First round
|
|-
|2007–08
|1D
|  style="text-align:right; background:;"|8
|align=right|30||align=right|11||align=right|7||align=right|12
|align=right|36||align=right|39||align=right|40
||Quarter-finals
|
|-
|2008–09
|1D
|  style="text-align:right; background:;"|5
|align=right|30||align=right|14||align=right|10||align=right|6
|align=right|55||align=right|34||align=right|52
||Fourth round
|
|-
|2009–10
|1D
|  style="text-align:right; background:;"|6
|align=right|30||align=right|13||align=right|5||align=right|12
|align=right|44||align=right|34||align=right|44
||First round
|
|-
|2010–11
|1D
|  style="text-align:right; background:;"|10
|align=right|30||align=right|8||align=right|9||align=right|13
|align=right|43||align=right|44||align=right|33
||Third round
|
|-
|2011–12
|1D
|  style="text-align:right; background:red;"|13
|align=right|26||align=right|6||align=right|4||align=right|16
|align=right|32||align=right|51||align=right|22
||Third round
|Relegated
|-
|2012–13
|2D
|  style="text-align:right; background:;"|4
|align=right|30||align=right|17||align=right|8||align=right|5
|align=right|64||align=right|32||align=right|59
||Third round
|
|-
|2013–14
|2D
|  style="text-align:right; background:;"|2
|align=right|30||align=right|18||align=right|7||align=right|5
|align=right|69||align=right|34||align=right|61
||Third round
|
|-
|2014–15
|2D
|  style="text-align:right; background:green;"|1
|align=right|30||align=right|22||align=right|1||align=right|7
|align=right|66||align=right|30||align=right|67
||First round
|Promoted
|-
|2015–16
|1D
|  style="text-align:right; background:;"|10
|align=right|33||align=right|10||align=right|4||align=right|19
|align=right|37||align=right|48||align=right|34
||Third round
|
|-
|2016–17
|1D
|  style="text-align:right; background:red;"|11
|align=right|33||align=right|9||align=right|8||align=right|16
|align=right|45||align=right|51||align=right|35
||Quarter-finals
|Relegated
|-
|2017–18
|2D
|  style="text-align:right; background:green;"|2
|align=right|22||align=right|14||align=right|4||align=right|4
|align=right|41||align=right|21||align=right|46
||Third round
|Promoted
|-
|2018–19
|1D
|  style="text-align:right; background:;"|4
|align=right|33||align=right|13||align=right|11||align=right|9
|align=right|43||align=right|40||align=right|50
||Quarter-finals
|
|-
|2019–20
|1D
|  style="text-align:right; background:red;"|12
|align=right|33||align=right|5||align=right|11||align=right|17
|align=right|29||align=right|50||align=right|26
||Second round
|Relegated
|-
|2020–21
|2D
|  style="text-align:right; background:;"|4
|align=right|26||align=right|12||align=right|7||align=right|7
|align=right|48||align=right|31||align=right|43
||Second round
|-
|2021–22
|2D
|  style="text-align:right; background:green;"|1
|align=right|32||align=right|22||align=right|7||align=right|3
|align=right|60||align=right|33||align=right|73
||First round
|Promoted
|}

Note: 1D = Danish 1st Division, 2D = Danish 2nd Division

Records

Club records

Biggest attendance
20,315 v Kjøbenhavns Boldklub, Danish 1st Division, 1980

Biggest league victory
7–0 v Værløse BK, Danish 2nd Division East, 21 July 2006
7–0 v Korup Idrætsforening, Danish 2nd Division, 15 July 2003
7–0 v Arbejdernes Idrætsklub Aarhus, 24 October 1965

Biggest victory in European cups
7-0 v Bellinzona, Inter Toto Cup, 4 July 1987

Biggest league defeat
0–9 v Odense Boldklub, Danish 1st Division, 11 October 1998

Biggest defeat in European cups
0–7 v PSV Eindhoven, UEFA Cup, 16 September 1981

Player records

Most appearances

Most European appearances: Mogens Hansen, 6 UEFA Cup matches 

Top goalscorer in all competitions:  Mogens Hansen, 157

Top European goalscorer: Mogens Hansen, 2

Danish internationals

European performances
UEFA Cup 1973–74

Fortuna Düsseldorf won 3–2 on aggregate.

UEFA Cup 1976–77

RWD Molenbeek won 7–0 on aggregate.

UEFA Cup 1981–82

PSV Eindhoven won 8–2 on aggregate.

UEFA Cup 1989–90

Zenit St. Leningrad won 3–1 on aggregate.

1995 UEFA Intertoto Cup Group 4

References

External links
Official site (in Danish)

 
Football clubs in Denmark
Association football clubs established in 1939
1939 establishments in Denmark
Næstved